Rinópolis is a municipality in the state of São Paulo in Brazil. The population is 9,961 (2020 est.) in an area of 358 km². The elevation is 425 m.

References

Municipalities in São Paulo (state)